The Monette Water Tower is a historic structure located at the junction of Arkansas Highway 139 and Texie Avenue in Monette, Arkansas. It was built in 1936 by the Chicago Bridge & Iron Company in conjunction with the Public Works Administration as part of a project to improve the area's water supply. The Monette Water Tower is considered a good example of a 1930s-era elevated steel water tank. It was added to the National Register of Historic Places in 2008, as part of a multiple-property listing that included numerous other New Deal-era projects throughout Arkansas.

See also
Cotter Water Tower
Hampton Waterworks
Mineral Springs Waterworks
National Register of Historic Places listings in Craighead County, Arkansas
Waldo Water Tower (Waldo, Arkansas)

References

External links
An Ambition to be Preferred: New Deal Recovery Efforts and Architecture in Arkansas, 1933-1943, By Holly Hope

Towers completed in 1936
Infrastructure completed in 1936
Buildings and structures in Craighead County, Arkansas
Water towers on the National Register of Historic Places in Arkansas
Public Works Administration in Arkansas
National Register of Historic Places in Craighead County, Arkansas